The Presbyterian Blue Hose women's basketball team represents Presbyterian College in Clinton, South Carolina, United States. It currently competes in the Big South Conference.

History
Presbyterian began play in 1977. They made six NCAA Division II Tournament appearances in their time in Division II (1994, 1995, 1998, 1999, 2000, 2002), winning two games in their tenure. They began play in Division I in 2007.

Team record

Division One Only!

Postseason

NCAA Division II tournament results
The Blue Hose made six appearances in the NCAA Division II women's basketball tournament. They had a combined record of 1–6.

References

External links
 

 
Big South Conference women's basketball